Jhoothi Shaan is a 1991 Indian film starring Shabana Azmi, Mithun Chakraborty and Poonam Dhillon.

Synopsis 
Even after the end of her lustre empire, This is the Story of Ranimaa, who still believes that she is an empress, though her palace has now been turned into a hotel. She has three daughters, Krishna, Ganga, and Kaveri, and a son, Kuldip. The film's twist comes when Ranimaa is informed by the police about four bank-robbers who are staying in her hotel.

Cast 
Shabana Azmi
Mithun Chakraborty
Poonam Dhillon
Shakti Kapoor
Kanwaljit Singh
Pallavi Joshi
Deven Verma
Nadira
Sudhir as Abdul

Soundtrack
"Rani Ki Nikli Sawari" was penned by Javed Akhtar and the rest were by Yogesh Gaud.

References

External links 
 

1991 films
1990s Hindi-language films
1990s Urdu-language films
Films scored by R. D. Burman
Urdu-language Indian films